The Other Side of the Underneath is a 1972 British film written and directed by Jane Arden and starring Sheila Allen, Liz Danciger, Penny Slinger, Ann Lynn, and Suzanka Fraey. Other members of the Holocaust Theatre Company appear in the film. It is the only British feature film in the 1970s to be solely directed by a woman. Jane Arden herself also appears in the film. The title of the film is taken from a line in Arden's play Vagina Rex and the Gas Oven, which was a huge success at the London Arts Lab in 1969. It is an adaptation of Arden's 1971 play A New Communion for Freaks, Prophets and Witches.

Legacy
The film had almost mythical status amongst fans of radical, experimental cinema, partly because of its visionary and disturbing depictions of the mental state of its schizophrenic protagonist, and also its unavailability. Until the July 2009 showings at the National Film Theatre (BFI South Bank) and The Cube Microplex in Bristol, it had not been publicly shown anywhere since a July 1983 National Film Theatre tribute to Arden, who had committed suicide at the end of the previous year. The British Film Institute restored and remastered the film for DVD and Blu-ray release on 13 July 2009. The Other Side of the Underneath was re-released simultaneously with Arden's other two feature films Separation (1967) and Anti-Clock (1979); all three films were collaborations with the producer/director Jack Bond.

The film's credits boast a rich array of talent. In addition to Arden and many actors from her renowned Holocaust Theatre Company, the film was produced and co-photographed by Jack Bond, co-photographed by Aubrey Dewar and edited by David Mingay (who later went on to direct films such as Rude Boy, 1980), and Robert Hargreaves. Alcohol and LSD use was rampant from the crew during production, particularly with Arden.

Production
The locations for the films were primarily in and around the Welsh mining communities of Abertillery and Cwmtillery in Monmouthshire.  One early episode was filmed at the Newport Transporter Bridge. The extraordinary soundtrack to the film was primarily the work of the cellist Sally Minford who appears, actually playing the cello, in many interior and exterior scenes, and the sound editor Robert Hargreaves.

Cast
 Sheila Allen as Meg the Peg
 Susanka Fraey	
 Liz Danciger		
 Ann Lynn
 Penny Slinger
 Jane Arden as Therapist
 Sally Minford as Cellist
 Jenny Moss
 Liz Kustow
 Rosie Marcham
 Elaine Donovan	
 Bill Deasey

References

 BFI DVD Booklet for The Other Side of the Underneath Various Authors BFI 2009

External links
 

1972 films
British drama films
Films directed by Jane Arden
1970s English-language films
1970s British films